The Five Senses is a 1999 Canadian drama film directed, written and produced by Jeremy Podeswa.

The film premiered in the Directors' Fortnight program at the 1999 Cannes Film Festival, and had its Canadian premiere at the 1999 Toronto International Film Festival.

Plot
The Five Senses is about interconnected stories linked by a building which examine situations involving the five senses. Touch is represented by Ruth Seraph, a massage therapist who is treating Anna Miller. Ruth's daughter Rachel accidentally loses Anna's pre-school daughter, Amy Lee, in the park, when Rachel is distracted by the sight of a couple making love in the woods. Rachel meets a voyeur named Rupert (vision), and they become friends as fellow outsiders while he teaches her the pleasure of observing others. They eventually go to one of Rachel's hiding places, where she has him dress like a woman.

Meanwhile, Ruth tries to help Anna cope with the disappearance of Amy Lee and stays the night at her home. Robert, a professional housecleaner, has an acute sense of smell, and seeks out the people he used to see to absorb their scents and see if he can smell any feeling for him or why they stopped caring for him. His professional clients include his friends Raymond and Rebecca, who makes perfume. Robert's friend Rona, a cake maker, has lost her sense of taste, and has romantic problems after Roberto, whom she met on a vacation in Italy, arrives. Dr. Richard Jacob, an older optometrist, is losing his hearing and wants to remember all the sounds before he goes deaf. He had separated from his wife Sylvie, but later connects to a woman named Gail (Pascale Bussières) who helps him to cope and feel better about himself. In the end, Amy Lee is found, and Ruth and Rachel are reconciled.

Cast
Mary-Louise Parker - Rona
Gabrielle Rose - Ruth Seraph
Molly Parker - Anna Miller
Daniel MacIvor - Robert
Philippe Volter - Dr. Richard Jacob
Nadia Litz - Rachel Seraph
Brendan Fletcher - Rupert
Marco Leonardi - Roberto
Pascale Bussières - Gail
Paul Soles - Mr. Bernstein
Tara Rosling - Rebecca
Richard Clarkin - Raymond
Elize Frances Stolk - Amy Lee Miller

Critical response
For the CanWest News Service, Brendan Kelly wrote that "It sounds pretentious, and sometimes it is. But mostly it isn't, which is the real surprise in this often funny, understated ensemble piece that showcases some of the best acting in a Canadian film in the last year. The talented cast helps take this overly schematic script and make it feel real, with nuanced performances. The film works because you quickly forget about the follow-the-senses design and simply follow the stories of these intriguing characters seeking human companionship."

Katrina Onstad of the National Post wrote that "The Five Senses has the kind of trick conceit that could have been a leaden exercise in showmanship were it not for the meticulous control of director Jeremy Podeswa", and that "a lyrical touch saves The Five Senses from bogging down in its own sadness (lost child equals weepy movie), and there are some much needed, very funny moments, particularly from Parker's neurotic cake baker."

Awards

References

External links

 

1999 films
1999 drama films
1999 LGBT-related films
1990s English-language films
1990s French-language films
1990s Italian-language films
Canadian drama films
Canadian LGBT-related films
Films directed by Jeremy Podeswa
1999 multilingual films
Canadian multilingual films
LGBT-related drama films
1990s Canadian films